Percy Kay Whitehead (18 August 1877 – 19 January 1960) was a British sports shooter. He competed in the 1000 yard free rifle event at the 1908 Summer Olympics.

References

1877 births
1960 deaths
British male sport shooters
Olympic shooters of Great Britain
Shooters at the 1908 Summer Olympics
Place of birth missing